Takieddin el-Solh (also Takieddin Solh, Takieddin as-Solh) (1908 – 27 November 1988) was a Lebanese politician who served as the Prime Minister of Lebanon from 1973 to 1974, and again briefly in 1980.

El-Solh was born in Sidon, Lebanon. A Sunni Muslim, he was a legislator representing the Beqaa Valley from 1957–60 and 1964–68.  From 1964–65, he was Minister of the Interior in the Government of Hussein al-Oweini. In 1973, President Suleiman Frangieh named him Prime Minister and Minister for Finance. He served as Prime Minister until 1974, when he was succeeded by Rachid Solh. In July 1980, President Elias Sarkis asked el-Solh to form a government, but he was unable to do so and resigned in October.

His wife was Fadwa Barazi El-Solh.

Takieddin was known for wearing the tarboush. He was faced with extensive objection by the Syrians and was told to leave Lebanon. He spent his last days in Paris, where he died aged 80.

In art and culture 
The mansion Takieddin el-Solh and Fadwa Barazi El-Solh had inhabited was the subject of an installation displaying photographs, newspapers, films, texts and drawings in the exhibition of Gregory Buchakjian, Abandoned Dwellings of Beirut, that took place at the Villa Empain in Brussels, 2019.

References

External links
 New York Times obituary, Nov. 30, 1988
 Rulers.org entry
Takieddin el-Solh's mansion, beirut.com

1908 births
1988 deaths
Finance ministers of Lebanon
Government ministers of Lebanon
Interior ministers of Lebanon
Lebanese Sunni Muslims
Members of the Parliament of Lebanon
People from Sidon
Prime Ministers of Lebanon
Al Solh family